Ivan Vurnik (1 June 1884 – 8 April 1971) was a Slovene architect that helped found the Ljubljana School of Architecture. His early style in the 1920s is associated with the search for Slovene "National Style", inspired by Slovene folk art and the Vienna Secession style of architecture (a type of Art Nouveau). Upon embracing the functionalist approach in the 1930s, Vurnik rivaled the more conservative Plečnik's approach. The Cooperative Business Bank, designed by Vurnik and his wife Helena Kottler Vurnik who designed the decorative facade in the colors of Slovene tricolor, has been called the most beautiful building in Ljubljana. Vurnik has also drawn a number of urban plans, among these the plans for Bled (1930), Kranj (1933–1937), and Ljubljana (1935).

Life
He was born in an artisan's family in the Upper Carniolan town of Radovljica, Austro-Hungarian Empire, present-day Slovenia. His father was a rather wealthy stonemason and Ivan was sent to school first to Kranj and then to Ljubljana. 

Vurnik graduated summa cum laude in 1912 from the Vienna University of Technology. He enrolled in 1907 and studied under the supervision of the architect Karl Mayreder. In Vienna he became influenced by the Austrian Art Nouveau style, especially by the work of the fellow Slovenian architect Max Fabiani, with whom he maintained a lifelong friendship. Vurnik received a scholarship and travelled to Italy to study the Italian architecture. He married the Viennese artist Helena Vurnik née Kotler in 1913.

During the First World War he was an Austrian soldier on the Isonzo Front and in Tyrol. In 1917 and 1918 he worked on designing Austrian military graveyards in Aleksinac, Leskovac and Niš in Serbia. From 1919 he lived in Ljubljana.

Work
In October 1912, Vurnik was employed by the Ludwig Baumann. He renovated the interior of the parish church in Bled in the same year and in 1913–15 bishopric chapel in Trieste. 

Vurnik's search of Slovene "National Style" begun after the World War I, when he moved back to his native country together with his wife. The style is best exemplified by the 1921 building of the Cooperative Business Bank. The building, which is considered the most beautiful Ljubljana building, was designed by Vurnik, while the decorative facade, using the Slovene tricolor's "national colors" was actually created by Helena Vurnik. 

In the late 1920s he turned to a purely functionalist architecture and designed the headquarters of the Slovenian Sokol movement, known as Sokol Hall or Tabor Hall, because of its location in the Tabor quarter of Ljubljana, and two very similar structures, one in Golnik and another one, which was destroyed during World War II, in Kranj. He rejected the search for a "National Style". 

In 1919, Vurnik managed to establish a department of architecture within the Technical Faculty of the University of Ljubljana. Upon his invitation, the great Slovene architect Jože Plečnik became one of its founding faculty. 

Nevertheless, a rival relationship developed between the two. Vurnik thought it was Plečnik's influence in the conservative circles of local Slovenian policy-makering that prevented him to carry into effect his more functionalist projects. Another reason for the antagonism between the two architect might have also derived from their different political ideology, since Plečnik was a conservative and fervent Roman Catholic, while Vurnik (although also religious) belonged to the Slovenian progressive and national-liberal tradition.

After 1925, he devoted his time mostly to teaching. He continued to draw architectural and urbanistic projects until his death, but almost all remained on paper. Among the very few realized projects from this second period, the most famous are perhaps the summer swimming pool in Radovljica and Radovljica's only hotel, the Grajski dvor. A less famous, but still important work from this period is a set of family houses for industrial workers in Maribor, which fully exemplify Vurnik's new vision of a simple, ascetic and purely utilitarian style.

In 1965, Vurnik renovated the Slovenian national Catholic shrine at Brezje, thus briefly returning to the "National Style" which he had abandoned earlier in his career.

Awards
 In 1961, Vurnik was awarded Pechtl Award in Vienna 
 In 1966, Vurnik was awarded Prešeren Award in Ljubljana

In media
In 2013, Slovenian National TV broadcast a film, directed by Alma Lapajne, about the Vurnik couple's life story.

See also
Vladimir Šubic

References

Further reading 
Miran Kambič, Arhitektura Ivana Vurnika (Ljubljana: Arché, 1994)
Janez Koželj (ed.), Ivan Vurnik: 1884-1971. Slovenski arhitekt = A Slovenian architect, bilingual Slovenian-English special edition of the Architect's Bulletin of Ljubljana (Ljubljana, 1995).
Breda Mihelič, Art nouveau Ljubljana (Ljubljana: Zavod za turizem, 2005).

External links
Ljubljana Art Nouveau sightseeing Walking Tour, Ljubljana Tourist Information Center
Some of Vurnik's works in the Architectural Guide of Slovenia
Postal Stamp in Vurnik's Honour (1995) 
Article on Vurnik's renovation of the church in Brezje (with picture) 

1884 births
1971 deaths
Functionalist architects
Architects from Ljubljana
Slovenian Roman Catholics
Academic staff of the University of Ljubljana
Prešeren Award laureates
TU Wien alumni
People from Radovljica
Slovenian urban planners
Art Nouveau architects